Natasha Watcham-Roy (born April 28, 1992) is a Canadian rugby union player. She won a gold medal at the 2015 Pan American Games as a member of the Canadian women's rugby sevens team.

In 2016, Watcham-Roy was named to Canada's first ever women's rugby sevens Olympic team. In August 2018, she stepped away from the program. On 22 November 2018, she announced her retirement due to mental health.

References

External links
 

1992 births
Living people
Canadian female rugby union players
Sportspeople from Ottawa
Rugby sevens players at the 2015 Pan American Games
Pan American Games gold medalists for Canada
Rugby sevens players at the 2016 Summer Olympics
Olympic rugby sevens players of Canada
Canada international rugby sevens players
Female rugby sevens players
Olympic bronze medalists for Canada
Olympic medalists in rugby sevens
Medalists at the 2016 Summer Olympics
Pan American Games medalists in rugby sevens
Medalists at the 2015 Pan American Games
Canada international women's rugby sevens players